Florence Crannell Means (May 15, 1891 - November 19, 1980) was an American writer for children and young adults. For her 1945 novel, The Moved-Outers, she received a Newbery Medal honor award and the Child Study Association of America Children's Book Award.

Biography
Florence Crannell Means was born May 15, 1891, in Baldwinsville, New York.

In 1946 her novel about Japanese internment, The Moved-Outers, won a Newbery Medal honor award and the Children's Book Award (now Josette Frank Award) from the Child Study Association of America.

In his "Without Evasion" essay in The Horn Book Magazine, Jan/Feb 1945, Howard Pease says: "Only at infrequent intervals do you find a story intimately related to this modern world, a story that takes up a modern problem and thinks it through without evasion. Of our thousands of books, I can find scarcely half a dozen that merit places on this almost vacant shelf in our libraries; and of our hundreds of authors, I can name only three who are doing anything to fill this void in children's reading. These three authors – may someone present each of them with a laurel wreath – are Doris Gates, John R. Tunis, and Florence Crannell Means." Many of Means' books dealt with the experiences of minorities in America, such as Japanese Americans in The Moved-Outers and African Americans in Shuttered Windows.

She married Carl Bell Means and died November 19, 1980 at Boulder, Colorado. Means and her husband are buried at Crown Hill Cemetery, Wheat Ridge, Colorado.

Works
Rafael and Consuelo with Harriet Louise Fullen, Friendship Press, 1929
A Candle in the Mist: A Story for Girls, Houghton Mifflin Company, 1931
Penny for Luck: A Story of the Rockies, Houghton Mifflin Company, 1935
Shuttered Windows, Houghton Mifflin Company, 1938
The Moved-Outers, Houghton Mifflin, 1945; reprint Walker, 1993, 
Great Day in the Morning, Houghton Mifflin, 1946
The Silver Fleece: A Story of the Spanish in New Mexico, Winston, 1950
Hetty of the Grande Deluxe, Houghton Mifflin, 1951
The Rains Will Come, illustrator Fred Kabotie, Houghton Mifflin, 1954
Sagebrush Surgeon, Friendship Press, NY, 1955
Knock at the Door, Emmy, Houghton Mifflin, 1956
Reach for a Star, Houghton Mifflin, 1957
Emmy and the Blue Door,  Houghton Mifflin, 1959
Sunlight on the Hopi Mesas: The Story of Abigail E. Johnson, Judson Press, 1960
Tolliver, Houghton Mifflin, 1963
Carvers' George: A Biography of George Washington Carver, illustrator Harve Stein, E.M. Hale, 1963
It Takes All Kinds, Houghton Mifflin, 1964
A Bowlful of Stars, A Story of the Pioneer West, Houghton Mifflin, 1934

References

External links

 
 
"Early Images of American Minorities: Rediscovering Florence Crannell Means", The Lion and the Unicorn, Volume 11, Number 1, June 1987, pp. 98–115

 

1891 births
1980 deaths
American children's writers
American writers of young adult literature
Newbery Honor winners
Writers from New York (state)